Bhikangaon Assembly constituency is one of the 230 Vidhan Sabha (Legislative Assembly) constituencies of Madhya Pradesh state in central India.

It is part of Khargone District.

Members of the Legislative Assembly

Election results

2018 results

2013 results

References

Vidisha district
Assembly constituencies of Madhya Pradesh